K25AL was a television station serving Lake Havasu City, Arizona. It broadcast in analog on UHF channel 25 as an independent station. Formerly a Trinity Broadcasting Network (TBN) affiliate until 2018, K25AL was locally owned by Lake Havasu Christian Television. The station's transmitter was located near downtown Lake Havasu City.

History
An original construction permit for a low-power station on channel 25 was issued on July 10, 1984 to Lake Havasu Christian Television. Given the call sign K25AL, it was licensed on October 1, 1985 and upgraded its license to Class A on September 10, 2001. On October 19, 2007, the station was granted a construction permit to flash cut to digital, good for three years. The station surrendered its class A license to the Federal Communications Commission on April 8, 2013, reverting to a standard low-power license.

On July 20, 2021, the Federal Communications Commission cancelled the license for K25AL, as it did not convert to digital operation prior to the July 13, 2021 deadline.

Programming
K25AL broadcast the entire TBN schedule.

In the late 1980, K25AL broadcast locally produced programming in conjunction with Lake Havasu High School. K25AL broadcast a weekly student produced newscast called "Knight Life News". Segments were shot in the field, and student anchors introduced segments and performed interviews in a studio located in "I-Hall" on the LHHS campus. K25AL also owned a field production truck, mostly used to broadcast LHHS football games. Both home and away games were switched live to tape using a three camera setup. The recorded games were broadcast the following day. K25AL also occasionally broadcast LHHS basketball games and other city events such as the London Bridge Days parade. It is unknown when K25AL stopped producing local programming. The field production truck was still parked at K25AL as of November 2010.

K25AL also ran some syndicated programming in the '80s, such as fishing programs.

References

External links
Trinity Broadcasting Network

Trinity Broadcasting Network affiliates
Religious television stations in the United States
25AL
Lake Havasu City, Arizona
Television channels and stations established in 2001
2001 establishments in Arizona
Defunct television stations in the United States
Television channels and stations disestablished in 2021
2021 disestablishments in Arizona
25AL
Television networks in the United States